WNNZ may refer to:

 WNNZ (AM), a radio station (640 AM) licensed to Westfield, Massachusetts, United States
 WNNZ-FM, a radio station (91.7 FM) licensed to Deerfield, Massachusetts